Dutch Cemetery may refer to:

Dutch Cemetery, Madagascan bay where Cornelis de Houtman once landed
Dutch Cemetery, Chinsurah
Dutch Cemetery, Elmina, West Bengal, India
Dutch Cemetery, Kollam, former name of Portuguese Cemetery, Kollam 
Dutch Cemetery, Murshidabad, West Bengal, India